Maurizio Silvi (15 May 1949 – 24 May 2022) was an Italian make-up artist who was nominated in the category of Academy Award for Best Makeup and Hairstyling during the 74th Academy Awards for his work on the film Moulin Rouge! His nomination was shared with Aldo Signoretti.

References

External links

1949 births
2022 deaths
Italian make-up artists
People from Albano Laziale